Talochlamys is a genus of bivalves belonging to th subfamily Pedinae of thee family Pectinidae.

The genus has almost cosmopolitan distribution.

Species
Talochlamys abscondita 
Talochlamys araroaensis 
Talochlamys badioriva 
 †Talochlamys chathamensis 
Talochlamys contorta 
Talochlamys dichroa 
Talochlamys fischeri 
Talochlamys gemmulata 
Talochlamys humilis 
Talochlamys inaequalis 
Talochlamys laticostata 
Talochlamys multicolor 
Talochlamys multilamellata 
Talochlamys multistriata 
Talochlamys pulleineana 
Talochlamys pusio 
Talochlamys scandula 
Talochlamys williamsoni 
Talochlamys zelandiae 
Synonyms
Talochlamys dieffenbachi : synonym of Talochlamys zelandiae (Gray, 1843)
 Talochlamys gladysiae (Melvill, 1888): synonym of Laevichlamys gladysiae (Melvill, 1888)

References

External links
 Iredale, T. (1929). Mollusca from the continental shelf of eastern Australia. Records of the Australian Museum. 17(4): 157-189
 Schiaparelli, S. (2008). Bivalvia. In: Relini G. (ed), Checklist della flora e della fauna dei mari italiani. Parte I. Biologia Marina Mediterranea. 15 (Suppl. 1): 296-314

Pectinidae
Bivalve genera